Betty Montgomery (born April 3, 1948) is an American politician from the state of Ohio. A Republican, she formerly served as Ohio State Auditor and is the first woman Ohio Attorney General.

Education 
Montgomery earned a Bachelor of Arts degree from Bowling Green State University and Juris Doctor from the University of Toledo College of Law.

Career

County Prosecutor 

Montgomery was elected Wood County Prosecutor in 1980. In 1988, she was elected to the Ohio Senate where she chaired the Criminal Justice Subcommittee and the Senate Judiciary Committee. Montgomery worked on passing Ohio's first living-will law.

Attorney General 

In 1994 Montgomery was urged by Republican Party leaders to challenge Democrat Lee Fisher for the job of Ohio Attorney General. Montgomery was the first Republican attorney general in 24 years to hold the office. She faced an uphill battle against the very-popular Fisher. Montgomery campaigned on her record as a prosecutor. She narrowly defeated Fisher by a vote of 1,716,451 to 1,625,471. As Attorney General, Montgomery worked to increase funding for law enforcement and for more crime labs. She defeated Democrat Richard Cordray for re-election in 1998, earning more votes than any other Republican candidate.

Auditor 

By the end of 2001, Montgomery was term limited from being re-elected Attorney General. Ohio Republican Party Chairman Robert Bennett urged Montgomery to run for the job of state auditor. She swapped offices with then Auditor Jim Petro, who was elected as attorney general. Montgomery defeated Democrat Helen Knipe Smith and became State Auditor in 2003. Montgomery was the top vote-getter in the 1998 and 2002 state elections.

2006 election 

In 2006, Montgomery opted to run for Ohio Governor. During her campaign for governor, Montgomery challenged Ken Blackwell and Petro. After trailing both Blackwell and Petro in early polls, Montgomery dropped out of the governor's race to once again run for Attorney General. Her 2006 opponent in the general election was State Senator Marc Dann, who defeated Montgomery.

Later career 

Montgomery runs a private law practice and a consulting company. She is the vice-chair of the Bowling Green State University Board of Trustees and serves on several boards and foundations. She is the chair of a leadership institute named after Ohio's first woman speaker of the house, Jo Ann Davidson, that helps develop young, female leaders.

Awards and recognition

Montgomery is recognized for her civic and political achievements and has received awards that include the Robert E. Hughes Memorial Award, the Black Swamp Humanitarian Award, the Ohio Hospice Senator of the Year and the Medical College of Ohio Distinguished Citizen Award.

See also
List of female state attorneys general in the United States

External links
The Ohio Ladies Gallery: Auditor Betty Montgomery

References 

|-

|-

1948 births
21st-century American women
American prosecutors
Ohio Attorneys General
Ohio lawyers
Republican Party Ohio state senators
State Auditors of Ohio
Living people
University of Toledo College of Law alumni
Women state legislators in Ohio